Lee Seung-Yeul(born September 28, 1983) is a South Korea football player who since 2007 has played for Korea National League side Daejeon Hydro & Nuclear Power FC.

Lee made one Hauzen Cup appearance for Pohang Steelers.

References

1983 births
Living people
South Korean footballers
Pohang Steelers players
K League 1 players
Association football defenders